Diacme mopsalis, the mopsalis diacme moth, is a moth in the family Crambidae. It was described by Francis Walker in 1859. It is found in South America (including Venezuela), Central America, the Antilles (including Cuba, Jamaica, the Bahamas) and the southern United States, where it has been recorded from Arizona, Florida, Oklahoma and Texas.

Adults have been recorded year round in Florida.

References

Moths described in 1859
Spilomelinae